The 2005–06 Maltese Second Division (known as BOV Second Division 2005-06 due to sponsorship reasons) started on 24 September 2005 and ended on 8 May 2006.

Participating teams
 Attard
 Balzan Youths
 Dingli Swallows
 Gharghur
 Gozo FC
 Gudja United
 Gzira United
 Melita
 Mellieha
 Qormi
 Vittoriosa Stars
 Zebbug Rangers

Changes from previous season

 Tarxien Rainbows and St.Andrews were promoted to 2005–06 Maltese First Division. They were replaced with Balzan Youths and Gozo FC, both relegated from 2004–05 Maltese First Division.
 Santa Venera Lightning and Rabat Ajax were relegated to 2005–06 Maltese Third Division. They were replaced with Gudja United and Gharghur, both promoted from 2004–05 Maltese Third Division.

Final standings

Relegation playoffs

Top scorers

Results

Maltese Second Division seasons
Malta
3